General elections were held in Bangladesh on 1 October 2001. The 300 single-seat constituencies of the Jatiya Sangsad were contested by 1,935 candidates representing 54 parties and including 484 independents. The elections were the second to be held under the caretaker government concept, introduced in 1996.

The result was a win for the Four Party Alliance of the Bangladesh Nationalist Party (BNP), Jamaat-e-Islami Bangladesh, Jatiya Party (Manju) and Islami Oikya Jote. BNP leader Khaleda Zia became Prime Minister.

Background
The Seventh Parliament headed by Prime Minister Sheikh Hasina was dissolved on 13 July 2001, having completed its designated 5-year term (the first parliamentary administration to ever do so) and power was transferred to the caretaker government headed by Justice Latifur Rahman.

Electoral system
In 2001, the 345 members of the Jatiya Sangsad consisted of 300 seats directly elected by first-past-the-post voting in single-member constituencies, and 45 seats reserved for women. The reserved seats were distributed based on the national vote share.

Conduct
The international and national monitors declared the polling free and fair even though the Awami League alleged massive vote rigging by the BNP. The accusation was denied by the Chief Election Commissioner, who declared the charges "baseless". International observers, from the European Union, the United Nations and the Carter Center of former US President Jimmy Carter, also praised the heavy voter turnout, which was 75%.

Results
The BNP were the clear winners in terms of seats, winning a secure majority with 193 (of 300) seats. BNP's allied parties Jamaat-e-Islami Bangladesh, Jatiya Party (Manju) and Islami Oikya Jote also won a combined 23 seats, bringing the alliance total to 216 seats. As a result of the first-past-the-post voting system in Bangladesh, Awami League only secured 62 seats, despite a difference in popular vote share of only ≈1.4%.  Voter turnout was very high at 75%.

Of the 300 directly elected seats, only seven were won by women. This parliament marked an increase in the number of reserved seats for women (which are in addition to the 300 directly elected seats) from 30 to 45. Of these 45 reserved seats, 36 were awarded to BNP.

Aftermath
There were reports of violence targeting minority Hindus in the immediate wake of the elections.

With a clear majority BNP leader Khaleda Zia was invited to form a government and on 10 October 2001, was sworn in as Prime Minister and formed her Cabinet, which included members of her allied parties. The first sitting of the Eighth Parliament occurred on 28 October 2001 with Jamiruddin Sircar as its new Speaker.

Zia's administration completed a full five-year term, running from 28 October 2001 to 27 October 2006. However, disputes over the selection of a caretaker government, with disagreements between the parties over their neutrality, led to the 2006–08 Bangladeshi political crisis, which eventually resulted in military intervention. New elections were not held until December 2008.

References

General
General elections in Bangladesh
Bangladesh
General